The Bradley Braves football program represented Bradley University in college football. The school, known as Bradley Polytechnic Institute until 1946, began its football program in 1897, the year the school was founded. With exception of an interruption during World War II (1943–1945), Bradley fielded a football team every year until 1970. The team was known as the Indians until the 1930s. Bradley played its home games at Peoria Stadium in Peoria, Illinois.

References

 
American football teams established in 1897
American football teams disestablished in 1970
1897 establishments in Illinois
1970 disestablishments in Illinois